Ivan Nikčević is a Serbian handballer.
 Novica Nikčević is a retired Slovenian footballer and current football coach.
 Sandra Nikčević is a Montenegrin handballer
 Sanja Nikčević is Croatian theatre critic, distinguished professor of theatre history.
 Vojislav Nikčević was a Montenegrin linguist.